Perth Guildhall is a building at today's 102–106 High Street, Perth, Scotland. The structure, which stands at the corner of High and King Edward Streets, a block north of Perth City Hall, is Category B listed, dating to 1907. It stands on the site of a former guildhall that existed between 1722 and 1907. The previous building, which was torn down in May 1907, also used to hold theatre plays. Unlike today's three-storey structure, its predecessor was only two levels, the ground floor occupied by merchants, including D. Robertson booksellers and James Wotherspoon's hatters shortly before its demolition.

The foundation stone of today's structure was laid in the second half of 1907 by incumbent Dean of Guild, James Barlas. It was opened on 29 August 1908. The building hosted the Guild's activities until 1988, at which point it suffered collateral damage from construction work on an adjacent building. The hall was deemed beyond economic repair, and was sold for development. The Guild used the funds to purchase new premises at 5 Atholl Street, near the North Inch.

Its façade features sculptures in its segmental pediment, the work of H. H. Morton.

Previous structure and architectural detail

See also
List of listed buildings in Perth, Scotland

References

Guildhalls in the United Kingdom
1908 establishments in Scotland
Listed buildings in Perth, Scotland
Category B listed buildings in Perth and Kinross